The 2022–23 Ball State Cardinals men's basketball team represented Ball State University in the 2022–23 NCAA Division I men's basketball season. The Cardinals, led by first-year head coach Michael Lewis, played their home games at Worthen Arena in Muncie, IN as members of the Mid-American Conference.  As the fourth seed they lost to Ohio in the quarterfinals of the MAC tournament to finish 20–12 and 11–7 in MAC play.

Previous season

They finished the season 14–17, 9–10 in MAC play to finish in sixth place. They lost to Ohio in the quarterfinals of the MAC tournament.

Offseason

Departures

Incoming transfers

Recruiting class

Roster

Schedule and results

|-
!colspan=9 style=|Exhibition

|-
!colspan=9 style=| Non-conference regular season

|-

|-

|-

|-

|-

|-

|-

|-

|-

|-

|-

|-

|-
!colspan=9 style=| MAC regular season

|-
!colspan=9 style=| MAC tournament

Source

References 

Ball State Cardinals men's basketball seasons
Ball State Cardinals
Ball State Cardinals men's basketball
Ball State Cardinals men's basketball